Vasile Alecsandri National College may refer to one of two educational institutions in Romania:

Vasile Alecsandri National College (Bacău)
Vasile Alecsandri National College (Galați)